ISO 3166-2:GN is the entry for Guinea in ISO 3166-2, part of the ISO 3166 standard published by the International Organization for Standardization (ISO), which defines codes for the names of the principal subdivisions (e.g., provinces or states) of all countries coded in ISO 3166-1.

Currently for Guinea, ISO 3166-2 codes are defined for two levels of subdivisions:
 7 administrative regions and 1 governorate
 33 prefectures

The governorate Conakry is the capital of the country and has special status equal to the administrative regions.

Each code consists of two parts, separated by a hyphen. The second part is either of the following:
 one letter: administrative regions and governorate
 two letters: prefectures

Current codes
Subdivision names are listed as in the ISO 3166-2 standard published by the ISO 3166 Maintenance Agency (ISO 3166/MA).

Click on the button in the header to sort each column.

Administrative regions and governorate

Prefectures

Changes
The following changes to the entry have been announced in newsletters by the ISO 3166/MA since the first publication of ISO 3166-2 in 1998:

See also
 Subdivisions of Guinea
 FIPS region codes of Guinea

References

External links
 ISO Online Browsing Platform: GN
 Prefectures of Guinea, Statoids.com

2:GN
ISO 3166-2
ISO 3166-2
Guinea geography-related lists